The Church of St Matthew, also known as San Mattew tal-Maqluba, is a Roman Catholic church located in Qrendi in Malta.

History
The church of St Matthew dates its origins to 1674. It is important not to confuse this church with the medieval and smaller chapel of St Matthew located just on the right hand side of the church. The larger church was finished by 1682. The church was blessed by the parish priest of Qrendi Dumink Formosa on September 12, 1683. 

On April 12, 1942, the church suffered extensive damage to the point of nearly collapsing as a result of a direct hit by Nazi bombs during World War II, it being so close to the nearby military airfield. The church was repaired by architect S. Privitera. A new facade was built and two small belfries were built instead of the central belfry.

Works of art
The main painting behind the high altar, attributed to Mattia Preti, depicts the martyrdom of St Matthew the Apostle and dates from 1688. It is believed that this painting was commissioned by the French Commendatory Nicola’ Communette. In 1984 this painting was stolen by was later recovered and kept for some time in the cathedral museum. An organ gallery was also built in 1834.

References

17th-century Roman Catholic church buildings in Malta
Qrendi